The 2020 Middle East-Africa Rugby League Championship was a planned international rugby league tournament that would have taken place in October  2020. It was intended to be the third MEA Championship, following the 2015 and 2019 tournaments. The competition was to be held at the Tuks Stadium in Pretoria, South Africa. The competition would have seen the return of Nigeria and Morocco from the 2019 edition, whilst Lebanon and South Africa who both participated in the 2015 edition were to again feature in the tournament. The Rugby League European Federation (RLEF) has announced that the tournament will continue henceforth on a two-year cycle, with the fourth tournament originally planned for 2022. In June 2020, the tournament was postponed due to the COVID-19 pandemic. The next edition of the tournament is to be held in 2022 in Ghana.

Original fixtures

First round

Play-offs

See also

Rugby league in Africa
International rugby league in 2020

References

MEA Rugby League Championship
MEA Rugby League Championship
MEA Rugby League Championship
Rugby league international tournaments
Rugby league in Africa
MEA Rugby League Championship